Ellyn Stern is an American voice actress and voice director. The wife of fellow voice actor Richard Epcar, she has worked on various shows, including Genma Wars, Noein, and MÄR. She also voiced Masaki Kurosaki in the hit anime series Bleach.

Filmography

Anime roles
 Armitage III: Poly-Matrix - Rosalind Holhess
 Bleach - Masaki Kurosaki
 Fight!! Spirit of the Sword - Himeno
 Fighting Spirit - Nurse Tomiko
 Genma Wars - Parome
 Ghost in the Shell 2: Innocence - Haraway
 Legend of the Gold of Babylon - Rosetta
 Lupin III Part II - Marguerite Tiffany
 Lupin III Part IV - Elena Gotti, Additional Voices
 MÄR - Jack's Mom
 Metal Fighter Miku - Sayaka; Maki Yoshihara
 Mobile Suit Gundam Unicorn - Martha Vist Carbine
 Noein - Miyuki Goto
 Patlabor WXIII - Keiko Misaki, Additional Voices
 Skip Beat! - Mrs. Taisho
 Vampire Princess Miyu - Moru (Ep. 20); Sato (Ep. 21)
 Zenki - Hiroshi's Mother

Video game roles
 Blue Dragon - Jiro's Mother, Marumaro's Mother
 Shadow Hearts: Covenant - Veronica Vera
 Star Ocean: First Departure - Mrs. Farrence, Additional voices
 Star Ocean: Second Evolution
 Phantasy Star Online 2 - Maria

Staff work
(Lupin the 3rd, Blue Jacket Series) Director
(Pokémon Generations) Director
 Reign: The Conqueror - ADR Script
 Blue Dragon - English Voice Casting
 Jade Cocoon'' - Director

References

External links 
 
 
 

Living people
American casting directors
Women casting directors
American video game actresses
American voice actresses
American voice directors
Place of birth missing (living people)
Year of birth missing (living people)
20th-century American actresses
21st-century American actresses